Five Feet Apart is a 2019 American romantic drama film directed by Justin Baldoni (in his directorial debut) and written by Mikki Daughtry and Tobias Iaconis. The film was inspired by Claire Wineland, who suffered from cystic fibrosis. Haley Lu Richardson and Cole Sprouse play two young patients with cystic fibrosis who try to have a relationship despite being forced to stay six feet apart from each other. The film was released in the United States on March 15, 2019 by CBS Films via Lionsgate. It received mixed reviews from critics and grossed $92 million worldwide.

Plot
Teenagers Isabella (Stella) Grant and Will Newman have cystic fibrosis (CF), a progressive genetic disorder that damages organs and makes patients vulnerable to infections. Because of their compromised immune systems, patients with CF should not get closer to each other than six feet. Stella, who copes with her illness by trying to maintain control of her daily regimen, takes her medication religiously and follows doctors' orders precisely. Will, a cynical rebel whose prognosis is grim, is much more lackadaisical, an attitude that frustrates the meticulous Stella. Will has contracted B. cepacia, and is part of a new drug trial, but the infection makes him ineligible for a lung transplant. Stella has been on the transplant list for a long time. When she discovers that Will is not doing his treatments, she tries to help him. In return, Will only asks her for permission to draw a picture of her. Will begins to watch Stella's social media videos. Over time, they begin doing their treatments together. Will and Stella fall in love, but can't get closer than six feet to each other.

Stella's G-tube becomes infected, and she has to undergo surgery to get it replaced. Will deduces that Stella's sister Abby, who unfailingly cared for Stella, died from a botched daredevil stunt one year ago. Because Abby is dead, Stella must face the operation alone, while wracked with survivor guilt.  After learning of Abby's death, Will shows up to care for Stella, and he sings her the song Abby always sang to her before surgery.

As Will leaves Stella's surgical prep room, he is caught by nurse Barb. Barb tells him a story about two people with CF who died after they fell in love and broke the six-foot rule, contaminating each other. Will realizes he loves Stella too much to endanger her, so he tells her he can't see her anymore. Stella becomes upset and angry but eventually plans to meet Will. She decides to take back one foot that CF has stolen from her, and carries a pool cue that measures exactly five feet so she can keep precisely that far away from Will.

On Will's birthday, Stella's best friend Poe, another CF patient, dies. As an act of rebellion against CF, the two decide to leave the hospital to visit the lights that Stella could see from her hospital room, as Stella has long dreamed of doing.

While away from the hospital, Stella receives a text that her lung transplant is en route, which she ignores. She falls through the ice of a frozen pond as she and Will leave to go back to the hospital. She struggles but is near death when Will reaches into the water and pulls her out. Even though saliva contact is very dangerous for two people with CF, he gives her CPR to save her life. Stella survives, and Will and Stella are brought back to the hospital.  Will fears that CPR he gave her may have infected her with B. cepacia, but Stella's lung transplant goes smoothly, and miraculously, she has not contracted B. cepacia.

Meanwhile, Will finds out that the drug trial he has been on has not been working for him. While Stella is still under anesthesia following the transplant, her parents, Will's mother, and the nurses and doctors help Will set up the lights outside of Stella's room. After realizing he would likely infect her, Will decides to say a final goodbye to Stella and confesses his love for her. Before he leaves, he gives her his sketchbook of drawings he had done of her and her friends during their stay in the hospital.

Cast
 Haley Lu Richardson as Stella Grant
 Evangeline Hill as young Stella
 Cole Sprouse as William "Will" Newman
 Moisés Arias as Poe Ramirez
 Kristopher Perez as young Poe
 Kimberly Hébert Gregory as Nurse Barbara
 Parminder Nagra as Dr. Hamid
 Claire Forlani as Meredith Newman
 Emily Baldoni as Nurse Julie
 Cynthia Evans as Erin Grant
 Gary Weeks as Tom Grant
 Sophia Bernard as Abby Grant
 Ivy Dubreuil as young Abby
 Cecilia Leal as Camila

Production
In January 2017, Tobias Iaconis and Mikki Daughtry sold their untitled screenplay to CBS Films for Justin Baldoni to produce and direct.

Baldoni first became involved with cystic fibrosis when he directed the documentary My Last Days. He met YouTuber Claire Wineland and subsequently hired her as a consultant for the film. Wineland died from complications of a lung transplant for CF in September, 2018, a few months after filming was completed.

In January 2018, Cole Sprouse was cast to star in the film, now entitled Five Feet Apart. In April of that year, Haley Lu Richardson was also set to star, and Moisés Arias joined in a supporting role. Principal production began a month later on May 25 in New Orleans, Louisiana and concluded on June 26.

In 2020, about a year after the movie's release, a similar guideline for social distancing to help slow the spread of COVID-19 would become nearly universal.

A novelization of the screenplay by Rachael Lippincott was published in November, 2018.

Brian Tyler and Breton Vivian composed the score. The soundtrack was released on Lakeshore Records.

Release
The film was released on March 15, 2019, by CBS Films via Lionsgate. The studio spent $12 million on prints and advertising.

Reception

Box office
Five Feet Apart grossed $45.7 million in the United States and Canada and $34.4 million in other territories, for a worldwide total of $80.1 million, against a production budget of $7 million.

In the United States and Canada, Five Feet Apart was released alongside Captive State and Wonder Park, and was projected to gross $6–10 million from 2,600 theaters in its opening weekend. The film made $5.4 million on its first day, including $715,000 from Thursday night previews. Its three-day gross was $13.1 million, finishing third, behind Captain Marvel and Wonder Park. The film fell 35% in its second weekend, grossing $8.5 million, and dropped another 27% in its third weekend, earning $6.3 million.

Critical response
The website's critical consensus reads, "Elevated considerably by Haley Lu Richardson's performance but bogged down by clichés, Five Feet Apart doesn't tug at the heartstrings quite as deftly as it should." On Metacritic, the film has a weighted average score of 53 out of 100, based on 26 critics, indicating "mixed or average reviews". Audiences polled by CinemaScore gave the film an average grade of "A" on an A+ to F scale, while filmgoers at PostTrak gave it  out of 5 stars.

Andrew Barker of Variety praised the performance of Richardson, which he called "a star turn," though described the film as an "otherwise formulaic teen romance." Katie Walsh of the Los Angeles Times praised Richardson for the depth and range of her performance. Caroline Siede of The A.V. Club commended the lead performances but said "In the end... even Richardson and Sprouse can't fully overcome the clumsy mawkishness around them."

Response from cystic fibrosis community
Responses from the cystic fibrosis community were mixed. The Cystic Fibrosis Foundation welcomed the opportunity to raise awareness about the struggle many patients experience with the disease, while others found fault with the film's depiction of medically dangerous behavior. Others voiced concern about a terminal illness being romanticized and trivialized as a Hollywood teen romance plot device.

The film was promoted using Instagram, where the studio paid influencers to post about hardships involving love and physical distance. Many of the posts discussed family members who lived far away; the promotion was perceived as tone-deaf and trivializing a fatal disease. After the ensuing backlash, the campaign was pulled, and the studio apologized.

See also
 Everything, Everything
 Midnight Sun
 The Fault in Our Stars
 Keith
 A Walk to Remember
 Love Story
 Me and Earl and the Dying Girl
 The Space Between Us
 Contagion
 Me Before You

References

External links
 
 

2019 films
2019 romantic drama films
2010s teen drama films
2010s teen romance films
American romantic drama films
American teen drama films
American teen romance films
CBS Films films
Films about cystic fibrosis
Films shot in New Orleans
Lionsgate films
Films set in hospitals
Films directed by Justin Baldoni
Films scored by Brian Tyler
2019 directorial debut films
2010s English-language films
2010s American films